is a Japanese medical doctor, attorney, and politician of the Liberal Democratic Party.

Furukawa attended Keio University, receiving his M.D. in 1987, followed by a Ph.D. in medical science in 1994 and LL.B. in 1996. He attended the Legal Research Training Institute from 1997–1999 to be qualified as an attorney, and obtained his MBA at Saïd Business School in 2005. Furukawa served as assistant professor/professor of medicine at Keio from 1999, and as a part-time lecturer in medicine at Hirosaki University from 2001 to 2012. He is also founder and Chief Executive Officer of GBS Laboratory.

Furukawa was elected to the House of Councillors in the 2007 election and re-elected in the 2013 election. He represents Saitama Prefecture for the Liberal Democratic Party and Party for Japanese Kokoro. He previously served as Chairman of the Committee on Financial Affairs, and is currently a member of the Committee on Judicial Affairs, Committee on Audit, and Commission on the Constitution.

He serves as counsel to TMI Associates, a law firm in Tokyo.

References

External links 
 Toshiharu Furukawa official website

1963 births
Living people
Alumni of St Cross College, Oxford
Alumni of Saïd Business School
Japanese health care chief executives
Keio University alumni
Liberal Democratic Party (Japan) politicians
Members of the House of Councillors (Japan)
People from Saitama (city)